Affligem Abbey is a Benedictine abbey in the municipality of Affligem, Flemish Brabant, Belgium,  to the north-west of Brussels. Dedicated in 1086, it was the most important monastery in the Duchy of Brabant and therefore often called Primaria Brabantiae.

History

First foundation
On 28 June 1062, an hermitical fraternity was founded in Affligem by six knights who repented of their violent way of life. Hermann II, Count Palatine of Lotharingia (1061–1085) and his guardian, Anno II, archbishop of Cologne (d. 1075) donated the foundation grounds. On this land, the first abbey church, dedicated to Saint Peter, was erected in 1083. The Benedictine Rule was adopted in 1085, followed by the formal dedication of the abbey in 1086. The monks brewed beer as it was safer to drink than water.

The counts of Brabant, also counts of Leuven, became their protectors (Vögte) in 1085/1086. A number of their family members are buried in the abbey church, including Queen Adeliza of England (d. 1151), as well as her father Duke Godfrey I of Leuven (d. 1139). Queen Adeliza was buried in the abbey church in 1151, near the clockwork.

During the 12th century, the abbey became known for the strict adoption of the Cluniac observance. Several monasteries were founded by the monks of Affligem or assigned to the abbot of Affligem by their founder. Maria Laach Abbey in the Rhineland-Palatinate in Germany, was founded in 1093 as a priory of Affligem by the first Count Palatine of the Rhine Heinrich II von Laach and his wife Adelaide of Weimar-Orlamünde, widow of Hermann II of Lotharingia. Bernard of Clairvaux visited Affligem in 1146, where it is said his greeting to the Blessed Virgin was miraculously answered. In memory of this event, he donated his staff and chalice to the abbey (still preserved in the abbey).

In 1523, Affligem joined the Bursfelde Congregation, a union of Benedictine monasteries formed in the 15th century for the stricter observance of the Benedictine rule. In 1569, the Archbishop of Mechelen became secular abbot and the spiritual duty was exercised by a provost (praepositus), a measure that lasted until the dissolution of the abbey in 1796. In 1580 the abbey was destroyed by soldiers of William the Silent, but subsequently rebuilt.

Archbishop Jacobus Boonen introduced the Monte Cassino observance. At his insistence, the Prior of Affligem, Benedict van Haeften, founded in 1627 a new congregation, B. M. V. in Templo Praesentat, which included Affligem and several other Belgian monasteries, affiliated to the Congregation of St. Vanne, which had a stricter constitution than Bursfeld. It was dissolved in 1654. Haeften commissioned Rubens and De Crayer to decorate the church and the monastery in Affligem.

In 1796, during the French occupation, the monks were chased away from the abbey, part of the buildings destroyed and the lands confiscated. The last provost, Beda Regaus, preserved the miraculous image of Our Lady, as well as the staff and chalice of Saint Bernard. These came into the possession of a Benedictine monk, Veremund Daens, who in 1838 established a new foundation at Dendermonde.

John Cotton, whose De musica (c. 1100-1121) is one of the earliest musical theses, covers the ecclesiastical use of monody in the organum and the roots of polyphony. Jan of Afflighem, Jan van Ruusbroec's Good Cook in the Groenendaal monastery near Brussels, was important for the survival of theology in the wake of the Black Death. His theology strongly influenced Gerard Groot, who taught Thomas à Kempis.

Second foundation
In 1869/70, Affligem Abbey was re-established and agricultural activity resumed. A new church was erected in 1880. The brewery was re-opened in 1885, followed by a new dairy and cheese farm in the mid-1890s. During World War I, copper fittings and fixtures were requisitioned, but the brewery resumed operation in 1921. The brewery was destroyed in World War II. The brand name is used under license from the monks of Affligem, by the Op-Ale brewery in the neighbouring village of Opwijk, now owned by Heineken and renamed Affligem Brewery.  

Affligem Abbey is a member of the Flemish Province of the Subiaco Cassinese Congregation within the Benedictine Confederation.

Abbots

The first abbot of the abbey was Fulgentius (1088–1122), a monk of Saint-Vanne Abbey in Verdun. Among his prominent successors may be mentioned:
Franco (1122–1135), author of De Gratia Dei in twelve books   (Patrologia Latina, vol. 166, 717-080);
Albert, whose devotion to the Virgin Mary won him the title Abbas Marianus;
William de Croÿ (bishop) (1518–1521)
Charles de Croÿ (1521–1564)

Provosts
Benedict van Haeften, author of several religious works

Burials
 Godfrey I of Leuven
 Adeliza of Leuven, Queen of England
 Marie of France, Duchess of Brabant

Notes

References

External links

  
Affligem Abbey image
Affligem Stamp image

Christian monasteries in West Flanders
Benedictine monasteries in Belgium
Christian monasteries established in the 11th century
Burial sites of the House of Reginar
1869 establishments in Belgium
1796 disestablishments in the Southern Netherlands
1100s establishments in the Holy Roman Empire
1105 establishments in Europe
12th-century establishments in Belgium